Harbaugh's Reformed Church, now non-denominational and known as Harbaugh Church, is a historic Reformed church at 14301 and 14269 Harbaugh Church Road in Washington Township, Franklin County, Pennsylvania.  If is one of five properties owned by The Waynesboro Historical Society and is available for weddings, funerals and special events. It was built in 1892, and is a -story, three bay by five bay, brick Late Gothic Revival style building.  It features a steep, slate covered gable roof, brick buttresses, and lancet stained glass windows.  The building replaced an earlier church built in 1846 by George Harbaugh on farmland he owned. The property includes the church cemetery, established about 1845. Regular services were held in the current building until 1966. It was acquired by the historical society in 1983.

It was added to the National Register of Historic Places in 2002.

References

Churches on the National Register of Historic Places in Pennsylvania
Gothic Revival church buildings in Pennsylvania
Churches completed in 1892
19th-century United Church of Christ church buildings
Churches in Franklin County, Pennsylvania
United Church of Christ churches in Pennsylvania
National Register of Historic Places in Franklin County, Pennsylvania